The 1900–01 Bucknell Bison men's basketball team represented Bucknell University in intercollegiate basketball during the 1900–01 season. The team finished the season with a 12–1 record and were retroactively named national champions by the Premo-Porretta Power Poll.

References

Bucknell Bison men's basketball seasons
Bucknell
NCAA Division I men's basketball tournament championship seasons
Bucknell Bison Men's Basketball Team
Bucknell Bison Men's Basketball Team